Marcelo Barrientos (born 9 May 1970) is a Chilean long-distance runner. He competed in the men's marathon at the 1996 Summer Olympics.

References

External links
 

1970 births
Living people
Athletes (track and field) at the 1996 Summer Olympics
Chilean male long-distance runners
Chilean male marathon runners
Olympic athletes of Chile
Place of birth missing (living people)
Olympic male marathon runners